The South Fork Fishing and Hunting Club was a Pennsylvania corporation which operated an exclusive and secretive retreat at a mountain lake near South Fork, Pennsylvania, for more than fifty extremely wealthy men and their families. The club was the owner of the South Fork Dam, which failed during an unprecedented period of heavy rains, resulting in the disastrous Johnstown Flood on May 31, 1889.

The failure released an estimated 14.3 million tons of water from Lake Conemaugh, wreaking devastation along the valley of South Fork Creek and the Little Conemaugh River as it flowed about a dozen miles downstream to Johnstown, Pennsylvania, at the confluence of the Little Conemaugh and Stonycreek rivers form the Conemaugh River, a tributary of the Allegheny River.

It was the worst disaster event in U.S. history at the time, and relief efforts were among the first major actions of Clara Barton and the newly organized American Red Cross, which she had founded and led. The death toll from the 1889 flood was approximately 2,209.

Despite some years of claims and litigation, the club and its members were never found to be liable for monetary damages. The corporation was disbanded in 1904, and the real estate assets were sold by the local sheriff at public auction, largely to satisfy a pre-existing mortgage on the large clubhouse.

Dam and club history
The South Fork Dam was an earthen dam originally built between 1838–1853 by the Commonwealth of Pennsylvania as part of the Pennsylvania Main Line canal system to be used as a reservoir for the canal basin in Johnstown. It was abandoned by the commonwealth, sold to the Pennsylvania Railroad, and then sold again to private interests.

In 1880, at the suggestion of entrepreneur Benjamin Franklin Ruff, the newly organized club purchased an old dam and abandoned reservoir from Ruff which he had purchased from former Congressman John Reilly. Ruff envisioned a summer retreat in the hills above Johnstown. He promoted this idea to Henry Clay Frick, a friend of his, who was one of the wealthy elite group of powerful men who controlled Pittsburgh's steel, rail and other industries.

Despite being both well-designed and well-built when new, it failed for the first time in 1862, and a history of negligent maintenance and alterations were later believed to have contributed to its failure on May 31, 1889. Between 1881 when the club was opened and 1889, this dam frequently sprang leaks and was patched, mostly with mud and straw.

Major flaws regarding the dam

Before closing on Ruff's purchase, Congressman Reilly had crucial discharge pipes removed and sold for their value as scrap metal, so there was no practical way to lower the level of water behind the dam should repairs be indicated.  Ruff, while he was not a civil engineer, had a background that included being a railroad tunnel contractor and supervised the repairs to the dam, which did not include a successful resolution of the inability to discharge the water and substantially lower the lake for repair purposes.

The five cast iron discharge pipes, each with an inside diameter of two feet, had previously allowed a controlled release of water. When the initial renovation was completed under Ruff's oversight, it became impossible to drain the lake to repair the dam properly, having modified the dam and lake area it to suit its recreational interests. Most significantly, in order to provide a carriageway across the dam, the top was leveled off, lowering it, where it sat above the town of Johnstown, leaving it only a few feet above the water level at its lowest point. To compound the problem, the club owners and managers had erected fish screens across the mouth of the spillway which was intended to keep water from accumulating to the point of straining the dam; the screens became clogged with debris, restricting the outflow of water.

Daniel Johnson Morrell became a member of the club for the purpose of observing the state of the dam under its stewardship, and campaigned to club officials, especially to Ruff, its founder, regarding the safety of the dam. Morrell insisted on inspections of the dam's breastwork both by his own engineers, (including John Fulton) and by those of the Pennsylvania Railroad. Morrell's warnings went unheeded, and his offer to effect repairs, partially at his own expense, was rejected by club president, Benjamin F. Ruff (who died two years prior to the flood). Morrell joined the club to further express his concerns. Morrell died four years before the flood he had labored to prevent.

The dam had not failed completely since 1862. Notwithstanding leaks and other warning signs, the flawed dam held the waters of Lake Conemaugh back until disaster struck, in May 1889. The president at the time of the flood was Colonel Elias Unger. The founding entrepreneur, Benjamin F. Ruff, had died several years earlier, and Unger had been on the job only a short time.

The American Society of Civil Engineers launched an investigation of the South Fork Dam breach immediately after the flood. However, according to modern research conducted by, among others, University of Pittsburgh instructor Neil M. Coleman, the report was delayed, subverted, and whitewashed, before being released two years after the disaster. A detailed discussion of the 21st-century investigation, its participating engineers, and the science behind the 1889 flood was published, in 2018, as Johnstown's Flood of 1889 - Power Over Truth and the Science Behind the Disaster.

Club members
The charter members of the South Fork Fishing and Hunting Club, assembled by Henry Clay Frick were Benjamin Ruff, T. H. Sweat, Charles J. Clarke, Thomas Clark, Walter F. Fundenberg, Howard Hartley, Henry C. Yeager, J. B. White, E. A. Myers, C. C. Hussey, D. R. Ewer, C. A. Carpenter, W. L. Dunn, W. L. McClintock, and A. V. Holmes.

Alphabetically, a complete listing of club membership included:

Edward Jay Allen – helped to organize the Pacific and Atlantic Telegraph Company
D. W. C Bidwell – owner of a mining industry explosives supply company
James W. Brown – member of the 58th United States Congress, president of the Colonial Steel Company, and secretary and treasurer for Hussey, Howe and Company, Steel Works, Ltd.
Hilary B. Brunot – attorney in Pittsburgh
John Caldwell, Jr. – treasurer of the Philadelphia Company
Andrew Carnegie – Scottish-American industrialist, businessman, entrepreneur and a major philanthropist
C.A. Carpenter – freight agent for the Pennsylvania Railroad
John Weakley Chalfant – president of People's National Bank, associated with steel tubing manufacturer Spang, Chalfant and Company
George H. Christy – attorney in Pittsburgh
Thomas Clark
Charles John Clarke – founder of Pittsburgh-based transportation company Clarke and Company, father of Louis Clarke
Louis Semple Clarke – co-founder of the Autocar Company and developer of the first porcelain-insulated spark plugs
A. C. Crawford
William T. Dunn – owner of the building supply company William T. Dunn and Company
Cyrus Elder (1833-1912); prominent attorney; chief counsel for the Cambria Iron Company; author; civil leader; sole Johnstown resident club member, who had acquired Daniel Johnson Morrell's membership upon his death; flood survivor
Daniel R. Euwer – lumber dealer for Euwer and Brothers
John King Ewing – involved with real estate through Ewing and Byers
Aaron S. French – founder of A. French Spring Company, manufacturer of steel springs for railroad cars
Henry Clay Frick – successful American industrialist and art patron
Walter Franklin Fundenburg – dentist
A. G. Harmes – manufacturer of machinery through his Harmes Machinery Depot
John A. Harper –assistant cashier of the Bank of Pittsburgh, president of Western Pennsylvania Hospital
Howard Hartley – manufacturer of leather products and rubber belts through Hartley Brothers
Henry Holdship – co-founder of the Art Society of Pittsburgh and the Pittsburgh Symphony Orchestra
Americus Vespecius Holmes – vice-president of Dollar Bank
Durbin Horne – president of retail company Joseph Horne and Company
George Franklin Huff – member of the Pennsylvania State Senate from 1884 to 1888, member of the 52nd United States Congress, the 54th United States Congress, and the 58th United States Congress and the three succeeding Congresses
Christopher Curtis Hussey – Hussey, Howe and Company, steel manufacturers
Harriet Augusta Byram Hussey – wife of C.C. Hussey, elected as the club's only female member following her husband's death in 1884
Lewis Irwin
Philander Chase Knox – American lawyer and politician who served as Attorney General and U.S. Senator from Pennsylvania and was Secretary of State from 1909 to 1913
Frank B. Laughlin – secretary of the Solar Carbon and Manufacturing Company
John Jacob Lawrence – paint and color manufacturer, partner of Moses Suydam
John George Alexander Leishman – worked in various executive positions at Carnegie Steel Company, served as Envoy Extraordinary and Minister Plenipotentiary to Turkey from 1899–1901
Jesse H. Lippincott – associated with the Banner Baking Powder firm
Sylvester Stephen Marvin – established himself in the cracker business, founding S. S. Marvin Co., centerpiece to the organization of the National Biscuit Company)
Frank T., Oliver, and Walter L. McClintock – associated with O. McClintock and Company, a mercantile house
James S. McCord – owner of the wholesale hatters McCord and Company
James McGregor
W. A. McIntosh (president of the New York and Cleveland Gas Coal Company and father of Burr McIntosh and Nancy McIntosh)
H. Sellers McKee – president of the First National Bank of Birmingham, founder of Jeannette, Pennsylvania
Andrew W. Mellon – American banker, industrialist, philanthropist, art collector and Secretary of the Treasury from March 4, 1921, until February 12, 1932
Reuben Miller – Miller, Metcalf and Perkin, Crescent Steel Works
Maxwell K. Moorhead – son of James K. Moorhead
Daniel Johnson Morrell – general manager of the Cambria Iron Company, member of the 40th United States Congress and 41st United States Congresses
William Mullens
Edwin A. Meyers – Myers, Shinkle and Company
H. P. Patton – associated with the window glass manufacturer A. and D. H. Chambers
Duncan Clinch Phillips – window glass millionaire, father of Duncan Phillips
Henry Phipps, Jr. – chairman of Carnegie Brothers and Company, American entrepreneur and major philanthropist
Robert Pitcairn – Scottish-American railroad executive who headed the Pittsburgh Division of the Pennsylvania Railroad in the late 19th century
D. W. Ranking – physician
Samuel Rea – an American engineer and the 9th president of the Pennsylvania Railroad from 1913 to 1925
James Hay Reed - partner with Philander Knox in the law firm Knox and Reed, a federal judge nominated by President Benjamin Harrison
Benjamin F. Ruff – first president of the South Fork Fishing and Hunting Club, tunnel contractor, coke salesman, real estate broker
Marvin F. Scaife – producer of iron products through W. B. Scaife and Sons
James M. Schoonmaker – J. M. Schoonmaker Coke Company
James Ernest Schwartz – president of Pennsylvania Lead Company
Frank Semple
Christian Bernard Shea – member of Joseph Horne Company
Moses Bedell Suydam – M. B. Suydam and Company
F. H. Sweet
Benjamin Thaw Sr. – co founder of Heda Coke Company, brother of Harry Kendall Thaw
Colonel Elias J. Unger – managed hotels along the Pennsylvania Railroad, second and last president of the South Fork Fishing and Hunting Club, did not have a military record
Calvin Wells – president of Pittsburgh Forge and Iron Company. Nephew of Samuel Taggart who served as a U.S. representative from Massachusetts from 1754 to 1825.
James B. White – manufacturer of manganese ore through James B. White and Company
John F. Wilcox – civil engineer
James H. Willock – cashier of the Second National Bank
Joseph R. Woodwell – served on the board of directors for Deposit Bank of Pittsburgh and the Carnegie Institution for Science
William K. Woodwell – associated with Joseph R. Woodwell and company
H. C. Yeager – dry goods and trimming wholesaler through C. Yeager and Company

Johnstown Flood

After several days of unprecedented rainfall in the Alleghenies, the dam gave way on May 31, 1889. A torrent of water raced downstream, destroying several towns. When it reached Johnstown, 2,209 people were killed, and there was $17 million ($473 million in 2020 terms) in damage. The disaster became widely known as the Johnstown Flood, and locally known as the "Great Flood".

Rumors of the dam's potential for harm, and its likelihood of bursting, had been circulating for years, and perhaps this contributed to why they were not taken seriously on that fateful day. For whatever reason, at least three warnings sent from South Fork to Johnstown by telegram the day of the disaster went virtually unheeded downstream.

When word of the dam's failure was telegraphed from South Fork by Joseph P. Wilson to Robert Pitcairn in Pittsburgh; Frick and other members of the Club gathered to form the Pittsburgh Relief Committee for tangible assistance to the flood victims as well as determining to never speak publicly about the club or the Flood. This strategy was a success, and club members and attorneys Philander C. Knox and James H. Reed were able to fend off four lawsuits against the club; Colonel Unger, its president; and against 50 named members. Each case was "either settled or discontinued and, as far as is known, no one bringing action profited thereby."

In the years following this tragic event, many people blamed the members of the South Fork Fishing and Hunting Club for the tragedy, as they had originally bought and repaired the dam to turn the area into a holiday retreat in the mountains. However, they failed to properly maintain the dam, and as a result, heavy rainfall on the eve of the disaster meant that the structure was not strong enough to hold the excess water. Despite the evidence to suggest that they were very much to blame, the Club membership was never held legally responsible for the disaster. Knox and Reed successfully argued that the dam's failure was a natural disaster which was an Act of God, and no legal compensation was paid to the survivors of the flood; The perceived injustice aided the acceptance of “strict, joint, and several liability,” so that a “non-negligent defendant could be held liable for damage caused by the unnatural use of land.”

Individual members of the club did contribute substantially to the relief efforts. Along with about half of the club members, Henry Clay Frick donated thousands of dollars to the relief effort in Johnstown. After the flood, Andrew Carnegie, one of the club's better-known members, built the town a new library. In modern times, this former library is owned by the Johnstown Area Heritage Association, and houses the Flood Museum.

Aftermath
On February 5, 1904, the Cambria Freeman reported, under the headline "Will Pass Out of History":

South Fork Fishing and Hunting Club Historic District
The Johnstown Flood National Memorial sought stewardship of the club property to "significantly increase the park's capability to interpret the important events surrounding the Johnstown Flood and the individuals associated with it." The South Fork Fishing and Hunting Club Historic District was designated a national historic district listed on the National Register of Historic Places, in 1986.  The district includes eight contributing buildings remaining from the club. The district includes the club house and six cottages. They are representative of popular late-19th century architectural styles, including Stick/Eastlake, Gothic Revival, and Queen Anne.

See also
 In Sunlight, In a Beautiful Garden, a novel about the flood
 "'It's still controversial': Debate rages over culpability of wealthy club members" by David Hurst The Tribune-Democrat, May 25, 2014. Retrieved July 22, 2019.

References

Historic districts on the National Register of Historic Places in Pennsylvania
Gothic Revival architecture in Pennsylvania
Queen Anne architecture in Pennsylvania
Cultural infrastructure completed in 1883
Cambria County, Pennsylvania
History of Pennsylvania
National Register of Historic Places in Cambria County, Pennsylvania